Panrieng is a town in South Sudan that serves as the administrative headquarters of the Ruweng Administrative Area.

References

Ruweng Administrative Area